Carlo Gaudenzio Madruzzo (1562 – 14 August 1629) was an Italian  Roman Catholic cardinal and statesman.

Biography
Born in the castle of Issogne, Aosta Valley, he was the son of Baron Giovanni Federico Madruzzo and Isabelle of Challant, and nephew of Cardinal Ludovico Madruzzo, Prince-Bishop of Trento.

After his studies in Ivrea, Trento and Ingolstadt, Carlo Gaudenzio graduated in law at the University of Pavia in 1586. He perfection his formation in Rome with his uncle. In 1595 he was named auxiliary bishop of Trento and, at Ludovico's death (1600), titular bishop. On 9 June 1604 he also received the title of cardinal by Pope Clement VIII, being given the titulus of San Cesareo in Palatio.

In his rule of the diocese, Madruzzo fought heresy and the (often alleged) presence of witchcraft in Trentino, as well as in enforcing the dispositions of the Council of Trent. As a temporal prince, he also strove to find a balance of power with the nearby Habsburg preponderant presence. In 1620 he moved to Rome, managing to obtain the title of vicar bishop for his nephew and assistant Carlo Emanuele.

He died in Rome in 1629. He was succeeded by his nephew.

References

External links
 Complete biography 

1562 births
1629 deaths
People from Aosta Valley
Carlo Gaudenzio
Prince-Bishops of Trent
17th-century Italian cardinals
Cardinal-bishops of Sabina
16th-century Italian Roman Catholic bishops
17th-century Italian Roman Catholic bishops